Helga Marie Ring Reusch (1865–1944) was a Norwegian painter.

Biography
Falsen was born 29 May 1865 in Fredrikstad. In the late 1800s she traveled to France, Spain, Italy and the United States. She studied with Erik Werenskiold, Hans Heyerdahl, Eilif Peterssen, Gerhard Munthe, and Pierre Puvis de Chavannes. She was married to the Norwegian geologist Hans Henrik Reusch (1852–1922).

Falsen exhibited frequently at the Høstutstillingen. She  exhibited her work at the Palace of Fine Arts at the 1893 World's Columbian Exposition in Chicago, Illinois. She won a Bronze Medal at the 1900 Exposition Universelle in Paris.

Falsen died 13 October 1944 in Hvalstad.

Gallery

References 

1865  births
1944 deaths
Norwegian artists
Norwegian women painters
19th-century Norwegian women artists
20th-century Norwegian women artists
19th-century Norwegian painters
20th-century Norwegian painters